I'm Dangerous Tonight is a 1990 American made-for-television supernatural horror film directed by Tobe Hooper and starring Mädchen Amick, Corey Parker, R. Lee Ermey and Anthony Perkins. It made its debut on USA Network on August 8, 1990.

Plot
Loosely inspired by a novella by Cornell Woolrich, the film revolves around a cursed Aztec ceremonial cloak that possesses anyone who wears it. Young college student Amy (Amick) decides to make a dress out of the cloth. Once she dons the dress, she falls under the spell and becomes a remorseless killer.

Cast

Production
I'm Dangerous Tonight was produced for the USA Network, a basic cable network in 1990. The film's story was based on a short story by Cornell Woolrich.

Release
I'm Dangerous Tonight was shown on the USA Network on August 8, 1990.

Reception
From contemporary reviews, Ken Tucker of Entertainment Weekly gave the film a D ranking, declaring "The only reason I watched this hokey-sounding TV movie was to see Mädchen Amick, the much-abused Shelly, creepy Leo’s wife, on Twin Peaks." Tucker noted that Amick "goes from sedate college student to murderous temptress with ease" while concluding that "The rest of the movie is sanitized horror-movie piffle, with Anthony Perkins in a cameo role as — get this — a normal person." Scott Williams writing for the Associated Press stated that the film "is well-directed even if it isn't particularly well-written." and that Hooper "creates some scary images and is still prodding the material for thrills even when the script has run out of steam." Mike Duffy of the Detroit Free Press gave the film two stars stating it was a "modest, melodramatic tale of the supernatural" and that you should "turn off the brian. "I'm Dangerous Tonight" won't work any other way."

In a retrospective review, John Kenneth Muir in his book on Tobe Hooper found the film "never quite as scary or as violent as fans know Tobe Hooper can make it." and that "It isn't bad by any means, just fairly innocuous TV material."

References

Sources

External links 
 
 
 

1990 television films
1990 films
1990 horror films
American supernatural horror films
American horror television films
1990s English-language films
Films directed by Tobe Hooper
USA Network original films
Films based on works by Cornell Woolrich
1990s American films